The History Teachers' Association of Victoria (HTAV) is a professional association representing and supporting teachers of history in Victoria, Australia. The HTAV was founded by a group of teachers and was incorporated in Melbourne in 1980. , has over 700 members and 11 members of staff.

Publications 

The association has two ongoing publications. The Bulletin, a newsletter, published eight times a year, and Agora, the quarterly journal. Both publications provide members with information relevant to the teaching of history.

History 

The History Teachers’ Association of Victoria was incorporated as a legal entity in November 1980. Like any historical development this date, at first glance, appears somewhat arbitrary. It neglects the longer pre-history of causation and origin and tells little about the nature of the organisation.

This prehistory was long, dating back to the 1950s and the foundation of the Victorian Historical Association. It was during this rather lengthy period of evolution between the 1950s and 1980 that the aims, character and activities that form the modern HTAV were defined. Even the most cursory of glances highlights the continuities of this history.

The Bulletin and Agora 

The aims of the Victorian Historical Association were articulated clearly in its first Bulletin, published in October 1959, when the association was at least eight years old. This document proclaimed that 'This association of school and university history teachers is concerned to provide history teachers with a forum in which they can discuss professional matters. To this end it holds a number of meetings throughout the school year, sponsors lectures, discussions, film nights and displays.'

Agora, the association's journal, first appeared nearly a decade later. As if dropping from some point in the future, perhaps the 1980s, maybe the 1990s or could it be last week, the opening sentence declared 'Whether we like it or not History as a subject in the schools appears to be under attack. But why?...' This 1967 statement certainly suggests continuity over time. In addition to the editorial which has been quoted, this first issue contained articles by Wes Blackmore, then the Senior History Master at Yarra Valley Church of England Grammar School, Professor N. D. Harper and Lloyd Evans. Agora underwent a number of change formats over the next forty odd years before it became the glossy quarterly we recognise today. Unsurprisingly given that its history traverses decades, editors also changed. Nonetheless, from the first issue Agora has remained a cornerstone of the service the association provides its members.

The publishing activities of the association expanded through the late 1960s. In 1967 it produced two regular publications, Historian and Agora. Two years later these were to be joined by a third, the Journal of History for Senior Students, which was to be edited by Don Gibb from its inception.

1960s & 1970s 

In 1968, attempts were made to establish regional groups, ten in total, but these seem to have been relatively unsuccessful. At that year's AGM, a constitution for the association was adopted, formalising the VHA's existence.

The 1970s, despite concerns about the threat to History in schools voiced in the late 1960s, feature continuing growth and expansion of the association's activities although the decade appears to have culminated in crisis. Student 'seminars' in Australian history were held for the first time in the third (last) term of 1971 at Latrobe and Monash Universities, with approximately 1800 students attending. These figures are certainly a high-water mark although if the number of students attending VCE lectures in 2004 were totalled we would appear to be continuing to grow, albeit at a significantly more modest rate.

In terms of membership, the association continued to grow throughout the decade. By 1972, AGM membership climbed to 673. In 1975, when the VHA moved to premises at 85 Howard St., North Melbourne, which it shared with the Geography Teachers Association, membership had risen to 945, and was to reach 1144 by 1979.

Moves were made to set up a national association of History teachers, and the VHA was given the task of drawing up a draft constitution for the proposed body, which was to have been launched at Sydney University in May 1973. Ultimately, this national body was formed and exists today as the History Teachers’ Association of Australia. The VHA hosted the HTAA National Conference from 26–30 May 1978. This close association with the national body continued over subsequent decades with the HTAV hosting national conferences on a number of occasions, most recently in 2004.

While the 1970s membership figures and student lecture numbers suggest a thriving organisation, 1978–79 was described in the president's Report as a 'challenging year' during which it 'survived financial crisis'. That period of crisis seems to have led to a desire to reform the organisation with a new name and identity – the History Teachers’ Association of Victoria. So through crisis and a lengthy incubation, in November 1980, the organisation now known as the HTAV was established with Bob Neal as its first president.

1980s 

With a new identity as the HTAV, during the 1980s the association continued to evolve towards its current form. Perhaps the most enduring legacy was the 1986 acquisition of a permanent address for the organisation, 'The Bakery' at 402 Smith St, Collingwood. This premise has remained the association's home for nearly twenty years and would be barely recognisable by those who knew it then. Somewhat dishevelled, it was transformed in 2003 to include carpets, air-conditioning and retail outlets below.

From around the mid-1980s, with Tim Gurry in the role of the executive officer, the association expanded its repertoire of activities. While continuing to conduct professional development and publishing Agora the activities of the association expanded to the point that in the early 1990s, under the supervision of Bob Lewis, the publication of teaching resources and education kits constituted nearly half of the association's income in any one year.

1990s 

In the early 1990s the threat seemed to be coming from 'Australian Studies'; the HTAV mobilised to meet it by running conferences on how it could be used to increase the amount of History being taught. Most conferences during this period were held at the Collingwood Football Club, of which the association was a member. The position of Extension Education Officer became a fully funded Departmental appointment advertised statewide, and Tim Gurry was appointed to the position for three years.

The mid-1990s were a difficult period. In 1992, Jonathan Tapp, an inspiring teacher from Trinity, was elected president, but early in his term of office he fell ill and died of cancer early the following year. Collingwood Football Club became a difficult venue once poker machines were installed, and after a long search a move was made to the Veneto Club in Bulleen. In 1994 the association lost half of its funding for the EEO position, and had to make up the shortfall rather than have a half-time EEO. At the end of 1994 Tim Gurry resigned as executive director.

The loss of considerable state government funding during the early 1990s however meant that there was no longer the same level of government support for the association. The decline in education budgets also meant that levels of membership declined through the second half of the 1990s. This had rather significant implications for the financial viability of the association. This is perhaps nowhere more vividly illustrated than in the annual reports of the late 90s when the association experience a loss of over $60,000.

Despite the financial constraints of the 1990s, under the successive leaderships of John Cantwell and Jacqualine Hollingworth, the HTAV continued to provide for the needs of its membership and the wider History teaching community. As an organisation it represented teachers of History in the development of the Victorian Certificate of Education, the Curriculum and Standards Framework (CSF) and it successor the CSFII and more recently AUSVELS. It also continued to support classroom teachers by publishing an array of resources, Agora and conducting professional development and student lectures.

Executive directors 
 Tim Gurry (1984-1994)
 John Cantwell
 Jacqualine Hollingworth
 Michael Spurr (2005-2007)
 Nick Ewbank (2007-2008)
 Annabel Astbury (2008-2011)
 Ingrid Purnell (acting, 2011)
 Richard Smith (2012-2015)
 Ingrid Purnell (2015-2017)
 Deb Hull (2017-present)

External links
 Official Web site - http://www.htav.asn.au
 National Centre for History Education

Education-related professional associations
Education in Victoria (Australia)
Organizations established in 1980
Teaching in Australia
Organisations based in Melbourne